Kultianella is a genus of beetles in the family Carabidae, containing the following species:

 Kultianella sulcicollis (Putzeys, 1866)
 Kultianella sulculata (Putzeys, 1866)

References

Scaritinae